United Nations Security Council resolution 1241, adopted unanimously on 19 May 1999, after noting a letter to the President of the Security Council from the President of the International Criminal Tribunal for Rwanda (ICTR), the Council endorsed a recommendation of the Secretary-General Kofi Annan that judge Lennart Aspegren complete the Georges Rutaganda and Alfred Musema cases which had begun before the expiry of his term of office.

Both cases were set to be completed by 31 January 2000. Aspegren's term of office was due to end on 24 May 1999 while both cases were still in proceedings in Chamber I of the ICTR.

See also
 List of United Nations Security Council Resolutions 1201 to 1300 (1998–2000)
 Rwandan genocide
 United Nations Observer Mission Uganda–Rwanda

References

External links
 
Text of the Resolution at undocs.org

 1241
1999 in Rwanda
 1241
May 1999 events